The 11th World Sports Acrobatics Championships were held in Beijing, China, in 1994 between 28 and 30 November 1994.

Men's Tumbling

Overall

First Exercise

Second Exercise

Men's Group

Overall

First Exercise

Second Exercise

Men's Pair

Overall

First Exercise

Second Exercise

Mixed Pair

Overall

First Exercise

Second Exercise

Women's Group

Overall

First Exercise

Second Exercise

Women's Pair

Overall

First Exercise

Second Exercise

Women's Tumbling

Overall

First Exercise

Second Exercise

References

Acrobatic Gymnastics Championships
Acrobatic Gymnastics World Championships
International gymnastics competitions hosted by China
1994 in Chinese sport
Sports competitions in Beijing
1990s in Beijing
November 1994 sports events in Asia